ISMA University of Applied Sciences (ISMA) the holding, which provides education starting with pre-school preparation in ISMA Secondary school “Premjers” to doctoral studies at the University. 
The central office of ISMA is located in EU, Latvia, Riga. ISMA has two official branches in Daugavpils, Latvia and in Fergana, Uzbekistan – international branch. ISMA also  has representative centers all over the world: Russia, Ukraine, Belarus, Kazakhstan.

ISMA Structure 
 Premjers Secondary School;
 International School Premjers for 5-9 grade;
 publisher center, which publishes scientific and study literature;
 Scientific Research Institutes conduct promising research and development work;
 University provides education for all levels – from short-cycle to doctoral degree.

Studies at ISMA

Short-cycle 
Duration of studies: 2 years
 Real Estate Entrepreneurship
 Entrepreneurship in Restaurant Business
 Applied information Technology

Professional Bachelor 
Duration of studies: 4 years
 Business Administration
 Business Administration
 Music Management
 Business Communication
 Business Administration in Tourism
 Tourism and Hospitality Management
 Restaurant and Club Business Management
 Digital Technologies in Tourism
 Information Systems
 Telecommunication Systems
 Computer Systems Administration and Safety
 Intellectual Education Systems
 Applied Systems of Computer Modelling
 Applied Electronics Computing Systems
 Web Technologies
 Computer Design and Media Technologies

Master's Degree 
Duration of studies: 1–3 years
 Business Administration
 Information technology management
 Computer Systems
 Quantitative Enterprise Risk Management
 Enterprise Risk Management
 Administration and Safety of Computer Systems
 Telecommunication Systems
 Intellectual Teaching Systems
 Applied Systems of Computer Modelling
 Information Systems of Web Technologies
 Calculation and Information Systems of Applied Electronics

Doctor's Degree 
Duration of studies: 3–4 years
 Business Administration ( Dr. oec.)

History

ISMA 1994 
In 1994, on the basis of Riga Aviation University several private higher education institutions were founded, one of which was Information Systems Management Institute. Three directions of studies were accredited almost at once. These were Business Administration, Information Technologies and Tourism.

The Institute was led by its current president Prof. Dr.sc.ing. Roman Dyakon.

The administration of the Institute has settled on the innovative development, and that is why a lot of attention has been paid to technical support of the study process and application of the newest technologies in the work of the whole institution.

ISMA 2005 
ISMA continues dynamic and up-to-date development. Because of the growing demand for higher education ISMA opens its branches in Kiev, Daugavpils, Ventspils and Balvi.

ISMA develops its corporate style, which is still used nowadays.

Coat of Arms
The basis of the coat of arms is a classical German shield. In its center the shield bears a golden-fimbriated heraldic animal - a golden-maned silver unicorn against a maroon background to represent the colour of the Latvian flag. To this have been added a motto - Ubi Concordia, Ibi Victoria (Latin), meaning "Where there is consent, there is victory", which appears just above the unicorn. Below these is the acronym that stands for the higher educational institution - ISMA. The date of its foundation written in a classical Latin style appears at the base. The coat of arms is mounted into an exquisite (elegant) frame of silver and gold and is bound by a laurel wreath. The arms is surmounted by a golden-tasselled cappit - the symbol of academism and science, while a scroll bound by a golden ribbon represents the significance of knowledge.

The colours of the coat of arms:
 Maroon (purple) - the symbol of virtue, strength, might and unity.
 Golden (yellow) - the symbol of wealth, justice, generosity and the bright future.
 Silver (white) - the symbol of purity, innocence, youthfulness and hope.

The heraldic animal: Unicorn - a mythical animal, a running horse (capable of transforming into other animals) with a long, straight, golden horn at the forehead - the symbol of purity and virginity.

Flag: The formula of the flag: the triband of blue, white and blue BWB (blue-white-blue; 4:5:4). Blue associates with a higher power and nobleness of descent, bearing serenity and dignity. White stands for purity of thoughts, rectification and deity, openness and obscurity. The coat of arms appears in the center of the white strip symbolizing the eternal search for the truth.

The lyrics of the anthem of ISMA were written by Prof. Dr.sc.ing. Yury Shunin.

ISMA 2011 
In 2011, ISMA moves to its own renovated building. Now the secondary school, the college and the university are situated in one place, which optimizes the study process and its coordination. A separate building is suited for the administration.

Vocational School Sigma becomes a part of ISMA, which allows broadening the spectrum of the services provided.

In 2008, ISMA obtains the license for the Doctoral program in Business Administration.

ISMA 2015 
In 2015 ISMA is a modern, dynamically developing university with a broad range of study programs and specializations at all levels, from short-cycle to doctoral.

Also, ISMA structure includes private secondary school Premjers and private vocational school Sigma, which trains young specialists in arts, graphic design and computer modeling.

Currently, ISMA has a big structure of departments that work on organization of the study process, employment of the students, expanding experience and skills by participating in local and international conferences, as well as organizing sports, recreation and entertainment activities of the university.

In the past 10 years ISMA has become an international education institution: one third of the students are citizens of Russia, Ukraine, China, Uzbekistan, etc.

Scientific activity

Publications 

A range of periodicals publishes the works of students and
scientist from Latvia and from other countries of the world.
 Information Technologies, Management and Society
 Economics and Education 
 Information Society Review
 IT&M Conference Theses

Conferences 
ISMA traditionally holds several annual international
conferences in the field of achievements and new
developments in science and education, international
cooperation of the university with various international
companies and organisations, and new technologies, which
are applied in modern educational process.
The scientific team of ISMA is always open to new cooperation
in these spheres.
 Information Technologies and Management
 Open Learning and Distance Education
 Internship & Employment

Annual events 

 Knowledge Day
 Freshman Day
 Conference ”Internship and Employment”
 Career Days
 International Conference “Open Learning and Distance Education”
 Educational studios for high school students
 Master class “How to become successful”
 International scientific conference “Information Technologies and Management”
 Olympiad “ISMA Intellect”
 International mathematics competition “Kangaroo”
 Summer camp for elementary school pupils
 Summer school for students
 Academic readings
 Students' international internship
 Entertaining quest games

Festival “ISMA Invites Talents” 
Since 2009 ISMA has been holding its annual festival “ISMA Invites Talents” supported by Riga City Council. This event consists of diverse activities. They include scientific conference “Information Technologies and Management”, school Olympiad “ISMA Intellect”, international mathematics contest “Kangaroo” and performers' contest.
The aim of the festival to reveal new names and support young people facilitating their cultural and intellectual development, giving creative people the possibility to meet each other, exchange experience, get acquainted with different cultures, study the best examples of modern, classical and folk art, as well as to raise interest in education and science.

Sports competitions 
ISMA Sports Club is open for all professional and
amateur sportsmen.
Students have the opportunity to join one of ISMA
sports teams and take part in annual
Latvian Universiades.
ISMA sports teams:

 Floorball
 Volleyball
 Indoor football (Futsal)
 Greco-Roman
 Judo
 Table tennis
 Swimming
 Track and field athletics
 Basketball
 Orienteering

References

External links
 

Universities and colleges in Latvia